Radinio Roberto Balker (born 3 September 1998) is a Dutch professional footballer who plays for Groningen in the Eredivisie.

Club career
He made his Eerste Divisie debut for Almere City on 14 December 2018 in a game against Jong Ajax, as a starter.

On 20 January 2021, Balker agreed to sign for Eredivisie club Groningen on a three-year contract starting 1 July, with an option for an additional year. He suffered a serious injury during practice on 2 July 2021, sidelining him for months.

References

External links
 

1998 births
Living people
Dutch footballers
Association football defenders
A.V.V. Zeeburgia players
Almere City FC players
FC Groningen players
Eerste Divisie players
Tweede Divisie players
Derde Divisie players
Footballers from Amsterdam
Dutch people of Surinamese descent